The 2018 Massachusetts general election was held on November 6, 2018, throughout Massachusetts. Primary elections took place on September 4. Early voting took place from October 22 through November 2.

At the federal level, Elizabeth Warren was re-elected to the United States Senate, and all nine seats in the United States House of Representatives were won by Democratic Party candidates.

Incumbents seeking re-election won all major statewide seats: Governor, Attorney General, Secretary of the Commonwealth, Auditor, and Treasurer.

In the Massachusetts General Court (state legislature), Democrats gained one seat in the Senate and two seats in the House.

The number of ballots cast, approximately 2.7 million, was the highest ever in Massachusetts for a midterm election.

Governor and Lieutenant Governor

Incumbent Republican Governor Charlie Baker ran for re-election to a second term in office.

Primary elections for Governor and Lieutenant Governor were conducted separately on September 4, 2018, with the Democrats nominating former Patrick administration official Jay Gonzalez and former Obama administration advisor Quentin Palfrey. The Republicans re-nominated Governor Charlie Baker and Lieutenant Governor Karyn Polito.

Baker and Polito were re-elected in the general election.

Secretary of the Commonwealth
Incumbent Democratic Secretary of the Commonwealth William F. Galvin ran for re-election to a seventh term in office.

The Republican Party nominated Swampscott resident and security expert Anthony Amore.

The Green-Rainbow Party nominated Holyoke resident and community organizer Juan Sanchez.

Democratic primary
In the primary election, Galvin was re-nominated over Boston City Councilor Josh Zakim.

Polling

Results

General election

Governing magazine projected the race as "safe Democratic".

Attorney General
Incumbent Democratic Attorney General Maura Healey ran for re-election to a second consecutive term. Healey was a speculative candidate for Governor but declined to run.

Republican primary
The Republican Party nominated Bourne attorney James McMahon for Attorney General over Hingham attorney Daniel Shores.

Results

General election

Treasurer and Receiver-General
Incumbent Democratic Treasurer and Receiver-General Deb Goldberg ran for re-election to a second term in office.

State Representative and Republican National Committeewoman Keiko Orrall was unopposed for the Republican nomination.

The Green-Rainbow party nominated Northampton resident Jamie Guerin. Guerin previously served as Jill Stein's 2016 Massachusetts campaign co-ordinator.

General election

Auditor 
Incumbent Democratic Auditor Suzanne M. Bump ran for re-election to a third term in office.

Helen Brady, business manager of the Boston Pops and candidate for State Representative in 2016, was unopposed for the Republican nomination.

The Libertarian Party nominated former Congressional candidate Daniel Fishman.

The Green-Rainbow Party nominated activist and educator Edward Stamas.

General election

United States Senate 

thumb

Incumbent Democratic Senator Elizabeth Warren ran for re-election to a second term. Her opponents were Republican State Representative Geoff Diehl and independent Shiva Ayyadurai.

Warren was re-elected in the general election.

United States House of Representatives

All of Massachusetts' nine seats in the United States House of Representatives were up for election in 2018.

All nine seats were won by Democratic Party candidates. Seven seats were won by candidates seeking re-election. The 3rd District seat was won by Lori Trahan, after incumbent Niki Tsongas did not seek re-election. The 7th District seat was won by Ayanna Pressley, who defeated incumbent Mike Capuano in the primary election, and then ran unopposed in the general election.

Massachusetts Senate

All 40 seats in the Massachusetts Senate were up for election in 2018.

In the general election, the Democratic Party captured 33 seats, while the Republican Party captured six seats. The Republicans had previously held seven seats. The seat gained by the Democrats was in the Norfolk, Bristol and Middlesex district, where challenger Becca Rausch defeated incumbent Richard J. Ross by a two percent margin.

Massachusetts House of Representatives
All 160 seats in the Massachusetts House of Representatives were up for election in 2018.

In the general election, the Democratic Party captured 127 seats, the Republican Party captured 32 seats, and one seat (2nd Franklin) was won by an independent incumbent. The Republicans had previously held 34 seats; Democrats took seats in the 18th Essex and the 17th Worcester districts.

County
Counties in Massachusetts elected county commissioners, district attorneys, registers of probate, and sheriffs.

Ballot measures

There were three statewide ballot questions: Question 1, which would have placed limits on nurse-to-patient ratios, was rejected; Question 2, an initiative to create a panel of citizens to propose amendments to the United States Constitution about campaign finance, was approved; and Question 3, a referendum on a prior law regarding discrimination based on gender identity in public places, was approved, meaning the law will remain in effect.

References

External links
 Directory of Massachusetts candidates list of website links
 

 
Massachusetts